is an underground metro station located in Minami-ku, Nagoya, Aichi, Japan operated by the Nagoya Municipal Subway’s Sakura-dōri Line. It is located 12.9 kilometers from the terminus of the Sakura-dōri Line at Nakamura Kuyakusho Station.

History
Sakura-hommachi Station was opened on March 30, 1994.

Lines

 (Station number: S15)

Layout
Sakura-hommachi Station has a single underground island platform with platform screen doors. The theme color for this station is purple.

Platforms

References

External links
 Sakura-hommachi Station official web site 

Railway stations in Japan opened in 1994
Railway stations in Aichi Prefecture